"I Live for the Sun" is a 1965 single written by Rick Henn and performed by American pop band the Sunrays.

Origin and recording
Band member Eddy Medora on the origin of the song: "I had a chorus that went, 'Run Run Run' and Ricky Henn called me up to come over and finish it. I didn't come over." Ricky Henn went on to write "I Live For The Sun" but only used the three chords of the chorus of "Run Run Run" and wrote a different melody over those chords, created a new title and concept, new lyrics for the entire song, composed original verses and bridge. The track has an approximate duration of two minutes and twenty-five seconds. The Surf Punks later covered the song at a slightly faster tempo, omitting the bridge but featuring a dulcimer solo in its place.

Chart performance
"I Live for the Sun" reached #51 on the Billboard Hot 100, #20 on the Australian Singles Chart

Cover versions
Outside the US, it was also a #20 hit in the UK when covered by Vanity Fare. It was included on their 1966 studio album, Andrea, on Tower Records.
Australian surf music band The Peregians released it as a single in 2021. This version replaces the sung verses with twangy surf guitar.CD Baby release.

Popular culture
The song gained popularity through the television appearances the group made on a teenage soap opera of the mid-'60s titled Never Too Young.  The song's success was arguably a result of positive public response to the group's alternative musical fare and fresh new sound.

References

American pop songs
1965 singles
1965 songs
Song recordings produced by Murry Wilson